Ctenucha tucumana is a moth of the family Erebidae.

References

tucumana
Moths described in 1912